Serebrennikovskaya Street is a street in Tsentralny City District of Novosibirsk, Russia. It runs south-north. The street starts from the Altay Railway Overpass and ends near the southern facade of the Novosibirsk Opera and Ballet Theatre.

History
The street was first called the Alexandrovskaya Street, but was renamed in 1920 for Fyodor Serebrennikov, Russian revolutionary.

Gallery

Architecture
 Revenue House is a house built in 1910s.
 School No. 12 is an educational institution, opened in 1912. Architect: Andrey Kryachkov.
 Polyclinic No. 1 is a 1928 constructivist building designed by P. Shyokin.
 NKVD House (Serebrennikovskaya Street 16) is a 1932 constructivist building designed by I. T. Voronov and B. A. Gordeyev.
 NKVD House (Serebrennikovskaya Street 23) is a 1936 constructivist building designed by I. T. Voronov, B. A. Gordeyev and S. P. Turgenev.

Organizations
 Administration of the Novosibirsk Metro
 Sberbank of Russia
 Sinar Garment Factory

Transportation

Tram

References

External links
 Serebrennikovskaya Street: 'I'm Novosibirsk. Portrait of the microdistrict'. Vesti.Novosibirsk. Улица Серебренниковская: Я — Новосибирск. Портрет микрорайона. Вести.Новосибирск.

Tsentralny City District, Novosibirsk
Streets in Novosibirsk